The US Quidditch Cup 9 was the 2016 edition of the US Quidditch Cup, a quidditch club tournament organized by US Quidditch. The tournament was held in Columbia, South Carolina from April 16–17, 2016.

The Cup featured 59 teams from the United States and one from Canada that qualified through eight regional championships. Quidditch Club Boston won the Cup, defeating Rochester United in overtime, 140–130* in the finals.

Format
The 60 teams that qualified were divided into 12 pools of five teams each. Each team played against all other teams in their pool, and the three best teams of each pool advanced to the bracket phase. For the bracket phase, the 36 teams that advanced were seeded 1 to 36. Seeds 29–36 confronted each other in a play-in round to determine the four teams that would join seeds 1–28 for the round of 32.

Results

Bracket phase
In the semifinals, Rochester United beat the Ball State Cardinals 150*–110, while Quidditch Club Boston defeated the Lone Star Quidditch Club 90*–80. Quidditch Club Boston and Rochester United faced off in the finals, resulting in a 140–130* victory for Quidditch Club Boston.

References

External links
US Quidditch Cup 9
US Quidditch

US Quidditch Cup
2016 in sports in South Carolina
2016 in American sports
Sports in Columbia, South Carolina
Sports competitions in South Carolina
April 2016 sports events in the United States